Rubén Rayos Serna (born 21 June 1986), commonly known as Rayo, is a Spanish professional footballer who plays as an attacking midfielder.

Club career
Rayo was born in Elche, Valencian Community. He finished his formation with local Elche CF, and played only Segunda División B football until the age of 25, representing Villajoyosa CF, FC Barcelona B, Orihuela CF and UE Lleida.

In the summer of 2011, Rayo moved straight into the Superleague Greece, joining a host of compatriots at Asteras Tripoli FC. He scored five league goals in his first season, adding three in the campaign's domestic cup.

In 2012–13, Rayo improved his overall totals to nine goals and 12 assists. In the final of the Greek Cup, against Olympiacos FC, he put his team ahead 1–0, but in an eventual 1–3 extra time loss; he was eventually chosen Best Foreign Player for his exploits and, during most of his spell in Greece, was also club captain.

On 6 June 2013, Rayo signed a three-year contract with Maccabi Haifa FC, netting 11 goals in 27 appearances in his first year to help his new team to the fourth position in the regular season of the Israeli Premier League. In March 2014, he was involved in an incident with Bnei Yehuda Tel Aviv's Rafi Dahan, his harsh tackle producing an anterior cruciate ligament injury to his opponent which sidelined him for almost one year – he received a straight red card for his action, and Dahan was eventually forced to retire; following his retirement, Dahan filed a lawsuit against Rayo and Maccabi Haifa in an Israeli court. Dahan won the lawsuit against Rayo and Maccabi Haifa, the judge ruling that Rayo's actions were deliberate.

On 8 July 2015, Rayo joined French side FC Sochaux-Montbéliard, signing a two-year deal for an undisclosed fee. Roughly one year later, he moved to Anorthosis Famagusta FC in the Cypriot First Division.

Career statistics

Club

Honours
Asteras Tripolis
Greek Cup runner-up: 2012–13

Individual
Super League Greece Player of the Year: 2012–13
Super League Greece Foreign Player of the Year: 2012–13

References

External links

1986 births
Living people
Footballers from Elche
Spanish footballers
Association football midfielders
Segunda División B players
Elche CF Ilicitano footballers
Elche CF players
Villajoyosa CF footballers
FC Barcelona Atlètic players
Orihuela CF players
UE Lleida players
Asteras Tripolis F.C. players
Maccabi Haifa F.C. players
FC Sochaux-Montbéliard players
Anorthosis Famagusta F.C. players
Bandırmaspor footballers
Super League Greece players
Israeli Premier League players
Ligue 2 players
Cypriot First Division players
TFF First League players
Spanish expatriate footballers
Expatriate footballers in Greece
Expatriate footballers in Israel
Expatriate footballers in France
Expatriate footballers in Cyprus
Expatriate footballers in Turkey
Spanish expatriate sportspeople in Greece
Spanish expatriate sportspeople in Israel
Spanish expatriate sportspeople in France
Spanish expatriate sportspeople in Cyprus
Spanish expatriate sportspeople in Turkey